Nikolay Bayryakov (born September 5, 1989) is a Bulgarian Greco-Roman wrestler. He competed in the men's Greco-Roman 85 kg event at the 2016 Summer Olympics, in which he lost the bronze medal match to Javid Hamzatau.

References

External links
 

1989 births
Living people
Bulgarian male sport wrestlers
Olympic wrestlers of Bulgaria
Wrestlers at the 2016 Summer Olympics
Wrestlers at the 2019 European Games
European Games competitors for Bulgaria
European Wrestling Championships medalists
20th-century Bulgarian people
21st-century Bulgarian people